John Veitch may refer to:

 John Veitch (cricketer) (1937–2009), New Zealand cricketer
 John Veitch (horticulturist) (1752–1839), founder of Veitch Nurseries
 John Veitch (poet) (1829–1894), Scottish poet, philosopher, and historian
 John Gould Veitch (1839–1870), horticulturist
 John Veitch (footballer) (1869–1914), England and Corinthian footballer
 John M. Veitch (born 1945), American horse trainer
 Jonathan Veitch (born 1959), dean of Eugene Lang College and president of Occidental College